Upbeats and Beatdowns is the first full-length album of the band Five Iron Frenzy. It was originally released independently on November 29, 1996 before receiving a national release on April 8, 1997 on Five Minute Walk, under the SaraBellum imprint, with distribution from Warner Bros. Records.

Overview
The lyrics were generally received as being "relevant and forceful;" one reviewer commented that the band offered praise and worship "by the pound." The first track, "Old West", begins one of many themes that would recur on the band's subsequent releases. The track is critical of the ill treatment of Native Americans in the name of Christ, and the liner notes implore us to learn from the Sand Creek and Meeker massacres.

According to the Five Iron Frenzy MySpace blog, "Milestone" is often given the title "Nintendo" due to an incorrectly named mp3 distributed on file-sharing networks.

"A Flowery Song," was nominated for a Dove Music Award in the "Short Form Music Video of the Year" category. The video was filmed in Albuquerque, south of the band's hometown of Denver. Its content included an unusually energetic, raucous scene, in which volunteers wearing colorful costumes danced down a suburban street. These costumes were not obviously connected to the lyrical content of the video, and ranged from Disney princesses skipping to an Ace of Hearts aggressively dance-punching the air.

Track listing
All music written by Scott Kerr and Dennis Culp and all lyrics written by Reese Roper, except where noted otherwise.

Personnel
Five Iron Frenzy
 Leanor Ortega - saxophone, background vocals
 Nathanael Dunham - trumpet, background vocals
 Dennis Culp - trombone, background vocals, lead vocals on "Beautiful America"
 Scott Kerr - guitar, background vocals
Keith Hoerig - bass
(Andrew Verdecchio) - drums
 Micah Ortega - guitar
 Reese Roper - lead vocals

Additional personnel
 Jamie Awbrey – rooster crow on "A Flowery Song"
 Masaki Liu – producer, mixing, background vocals on "Beautiful America"
 Edith Bunker – background vocals on "I Feel Lucky"
 Frank Tate – executive producer

References

Five Iron Frenzy albums
1997 debut albums